Savvas Saritzoglou (born July 19, 1971 in Athens, Attiki) is a Greek male hammer thrower. He competed at the 1992 Summer Olympics in Barcelona, Spain, placing 13th in the qualifying round.

Achievements

References

 

1971 births
Living people
Greek male hammer throwers
Athletes (track and field) at the 1992 Summer Olympics
Olympic athletes of Greece
Mediterranean Games bronze medalists for Greece
Mediterranean Games medalists in athletics
Athletes (track and field) at the 1991 Mediterranean Games
Athletes from Athens